José Ángel Martínez Gómez (born 3 June 1997) is a Mexican swimmer. He competed in the men's 100 metre butterfly event at the 2017 World Aquatics Championships.  He also competed in the men's 200 metre individual medley at the 2020 Summer Olympics.

References

External links
 

1997 births
Living people
Sportspeople from Nuevo Laredo
Mexican male swimmers
Pan American Games medalists in swimming
Pan American Games bronze medalists for Mexico
Swimmers at the 2019 Pan American Games
Swimmers at the 2015 Pan American Games
Swimmers at the 2020 Summer Olympics
Male butterfly swimmers
Medalists at the 2019 Pan American Games
Olympic swimmers of Mexico
Texas A&M Aggies men's swimmers
20th-century Mexican people
21st-century Mexican people